Campyloneurum angustifolium is a fern species in the family Polypodiaceae, commonly known as narrow strapfern or narrow-leaf strap fern.

It is native to Florida, Puerto Rico, Cuba, Jamaica, Mexico, Mesoamerica, Central America, Kerala, and tropical South America.

References

WL Chiou, DR Farrar, TA Ranker, (2002). "The mating systems of some epiphytic Polypodiaceae." American Fern Journal. Volume 99 Issue 1.

angustifolium
Ferns of the Americas
Flora of Central America
Flora of the Caribbean
Flora of South America
Ferns of Brazil
Ferns of Mexico
Ferns of the United States
Flora of Florida
Least concern flora of the United States
Least concern biota of North America